The Mumbai–Chennai line is a railway line connecting Chennai and Mumbai cutting across southern part of the Deccan Plateau. The Mumbai–Chennai line is a part of Diamond Quadrilateral.

Sections
The -long trunk line, amongst the long and busy trunk lines connecting the metros, has been treated in more detail in smaller sections:
Central line (Mumbai Suburban Railway)
Mumbai Dadar–Solapur section
Solapur–Guntakal section
Guntakal–Renigunta section
Renigunta–Chennai section

History
The first passenger train in India from Chhatrapati Shivaji Maharaj Terminus in Mumbai to Thane ran on 16 April 1853 on the track laid by the Great Indian Peninsula Railway. The GIPR line was extended to Kalyan in 1854 and then on the south-east side to Khopoli via Palasdari railway station at the foot of the Western Ghats in 1856. While construction work was in progress across the Bhor Ghat, GIPR opened to public the Khandala–Pune track in 1858.

The Bhor Ghat incline connecting Palasdari to Khandala was completed in 1862, thereby connecting Mumbai and Pune. The Western Ghats presented a big obstacle to the railway engineers in the 1860s. The summit of the Bhor Ghat (earlier spelt as Bhore Ghat) incline being 2,027 feet. The maximum gradient was: 1 in 37 with extreme curvature. "The works on the Bhore ghat comprised 25 tunnels of a total length of nearly 4,000 yards, two of the longest being 435 yards and 341 yards respectively. The Bhore ghat have eight lofty viaducts having a total length of 2,961 feet. Two of the largest are more than 500 feet long with a maximum height of 1160 and 163 feet. There are 22 bridges of spans from 7 to 30 feet and 81 culverts of various sizes." The construction of the Bhor Ghat incline came at a high price: an estimated 24,000 builders died during the eight years of construction.

The Pune–Raichur sector of the Mumbai–Chennai line was opened in stages: the portion from Pune to Barshi Road was opened in 1859, from Barshi Road to Mohol in 1860 and from Mohol to Solapur also in 1860. Work on the line from Solapur southwards was begun in 1865 and the line was extended to Raichur in 1871. Thus the line met the line of Madras Railway thereby establishing direct Mumbai–Chennai link.

The first passenger train in southern India and the third in India was operated by Madras Railway from Royapuram to Wallajah Road (Arcot) in 1856. MR extended its trunk route to Beypur / Kadalundi (near Calicut) and initiated work on a north-western branch out of Arakkonam in 1861. The branch line reached Renigunta in 1862, and to Raichur in 1871, where it connected to the Great Indian Peninsula Railway line from Mumbai.

Electrification

Railway electrification in India began with the first electric train, between Bombay Victoria Terminus and Kurla by the Great Indian Peninsula Railway's (GIPR) on 3 February 1925, on 1.5 kV DC. The Kalyan–Pune section was electrified with 1.5 kV DC overhead system in 1930.

The previously used 1.5 kV DC was converted to 25 kV AC on 5 May 2013 from Kalyan to Khopoli and Kalyan to Kasara. Conversion from 1.5 kV DC to 25 kV AC on the Lokmanya Tilak Terminus-Thane-Kalyan section was completed on 12 January 2014. The CSMT to LTT section was converted from 1.5 kV DC to 25 kV AC on 8 June 2015. The Kasara-Pune section was also converted from 1.5 kV DC to 25 kV AC.

The Pune–Daund section as well as Daund-Bhigwan section was electrified in 2017. The electrification of the Bhigwan-Kalaburgi section was completed by March 2022. The Kalaburgi-Wadi section was electrified in 2018.

The Renigunta–Nandalur sector electrification was completed in 2006. The Nandalur–Guntakal sector was electrified by Dec 2013. The electrification of the Guntakal-Wadi section was completed in 2015.

The Puratchi Thalaivar Dr. M.G. Ramachandran Central Railway Station–Tiruvallur sector, as well as the Basin Bridge–Chennai Beach sector were electrified in 1979–80. The Tiruvallu–Arakkonam sector was electrified in 1982–83, Arakkonam–Tiruttani sector in 1983–84 and the Tiruttani–Renigunta sector in 1984–85.

Hence, the entire Mumbai-Chennai route is completely electrified.

Speed limit
The stretch between Chhatrapati Shivaji Maharaj Terminus and Kalyan is classified as 'Group A' line, where trains can take speed up to 160 km/h. The Kalyan–Pune–Daund–Wadi line and the Wadi–Raichur–Adoni–Arrakonam–Puratchi Thalaivar Dr. M.G. Ramachandran Central railway station line are classified as 'Group B' lines and can take speeds up to 130 km/h.

Passenger movement
CST Mumbai, Pune, Solapur and MGR Central, on this line, are amongst the top hundred booking stations of Indian Railway.

References

External links
Trains at Mumbai CST
Trains at Pune
Trains at Daund
Trains at Solapur
Trains at Wadi
Trains at Raichur
Trains at Adoni
Trains at Guntakal
Trains at Chennai Central

5 ft 6 in gauge railways in India
Railway lines opened in 1871
Rail transport in Tamil Nadu
Rail transport in Andhra Pradesh
Rail transport in Karnataka
Rail transport in Maharashtra
1871 establishments in India